The Sheriff of Perth was historically a royal official, appointed for life, who was responsible for enforcing justice in Perth, Scotland.  Prior to 1748 most sheriffdoms were held on a hereditary basis. From that date, following the Jacobite uprising of 1745, the hereditary sheriffs were replaced by salaried sheriff-deputes, qualified advocates who were members of the Scottish Bar.

Following consecutive reorganisations of the Scottish sheriffdoms the position became the Sheriff of Perthshire in 1747 and the Sheriff of Perth & Angus in 1934.

The sheriffdom was dissolved in 1975 and replaced by that of Tayside, Central and Fife.

Sheriffs of Perth
Kenneth (1164)
Roger de Mortimer of Aberdour (1209)
John de Moray (1210)
Geoffrey de Inverkunglas (1219)
John Hay of Naughton (1226-1228)
William Blund (1228)
Malcolm of Moray (1236)
Adam de Lochore
William de Munfichet (1245)
John Hay of Naughton (1246)
William de Lauder (1251)
David de Lochore (1255)
Gilbert de la Hay (1262)
John Cameron (1264)
George de Cambrun (1266)
Christian de l'Isle (1280)
Nicholas de la Haye (1289)
Walter de Burghdon (1295)
John de Inchmartin (1305)
Alexander de Abernethy (1305)
John de Stirling (1334)
Andrew Buthirgask (1344)
John Denniston (1355)
Harry de Fotheringay (1357)
Hugh de Ros (1362)
Andrew Buthirgask (1365)
Robert Stewart of Innermeath (1369)
Alexander Abercrombie (1370)
Thomas de Wanchope (1373)
Walter Stewart of Ralston (1381)
Walter Stewart, Earl of Atholl (1433)
John Spence - 1433 - Deputy
Archibald Stewart - 1439 - Deputy
Patrick Charteris (1440)
John de Haddington (1441)
William Ruthven (1443)
Patrick Charteris (1446)
Patrick Graham, Lord Graham (1459)
William Graham (1465)
Laurence Oliphant, 1st Lord Oliphant (1470)
Robert Abercromby (1478)
John Murray, 1st Duke of Atholl (1695–1724)
James Murray, 2nd Duke of Atholl (1724-1748)

Sheriffs of Perthshire (1747)
Patrick Haldane, 1747-1748 
James Erskine, 1748–1754 
John Swinton, 1754–1782 (died 1799)
William Nairne of Dunsinnan, 1783– 
Archibald Colquhoun, 1793–1807
John Hay Forbes, Lord Medwyn, 1807–1824 
Duncan McNeill, 1st Baron Colonsay, 1824–1834 
Adam Anderson, 1835–1841 
Robert Whigham, 1841–1849  
James Craufurd, 1849–1853 
Edward Gordon, Baron Gordon of Drumearn, 1858–1866
John Tait, 1866–1874 
James Adam, 1874–1876
John Macdonald, Lord Kingsburgh, 1880–
William Gloag, Lord Kincairney, 1885–1889 
Charles Pearson, 1889–1890
Andrew Graham Murray, 1890–1891
Andrew Jameson, Lord Ardwall, 1891–1905
Christopher Nicholson Johnston, KC, 1905–1916 
John Wilson KC, 1917–1920
James Condie Stewart Sandeman KC, 1920–

Sheriffs of Perth and Angus (1934)
Daniel Patterson Blades, 1934-1945  (Solicitor General for Scotland, 1945)
James Frederick Strachan, KC, 1945–1948  
Laurence Hill Watson, KC, 1948–1952 
Thomas Blantyre Simpson, QC, 1952–1954  
Christopher William Graham Guest, QC, 1954–1955  
Sir James Randall Philip, QC, 1955–1957 
Charles Shaw, Baron Kilbrandon, 1957–1958 
Hector McKechnie, QC, 1958–1963  
George Emslie, Baron Emslie, 1963–1966 
Ian MacDonald Robertson, QC, 1966–1966 
Margaret Henderson Kidd, QC, 1966–1974 
William Murray, 8th Earl of Mansfield and Mansfield, 1974–1975
Sheriffdom replaced in 1975 by the sheriffdom of Tayside, Central and Fife.

See also
 Historical development of Scottish sheriffdoms

References

History of Perth, Scotland